The Jerusalem Lions, commonly known as the Jerusalem "Big Blue" Lions, are an amateur American football team based in Jerusalem. The Lions were a founding member of and currently compete in the Israel Football League.

History 
The Lions began as a flag football team in American Football in Israel, which was the precursor to and is now the governing body of the Israel Football League (IFL). In 2005, the Lions were one of the four founding teams of the IFL and in 2007 played in the inaugural IFL season.

They have appeared in seven Israel Bowls and won IsraBowl I, IsraBowl X, IsraBowl XI and, most recently, IsraBowl XII against the Petah Tikva Troopers.

Sponsorship 
The Lions are sponsored by Big Blue Travel, a travel agency based in New York, which has led to their nickname "Big Blue."

Stadium 
The Lions play their home games at the Kraft Family Sports Campus in Jerusalem.

References 

American football teams in Israel
Sport in Jerusalem
American football teams established in 2005
2005 establishments in Israel